Ken or Kenneth Anderson may refer to:

Entertainment
 Ken Anderson (animator) (1909–1993), art director, writer, and animator at Disney
 Ken Anderson (filmmaker) (1917–2006), Christian filmmaker
 Kenneth Anderson (musician) (born 1958), musician and choir director of the Gospel tradition
 Kenneth Anderson (writer) (1910–1974), Indian writer and hunter
 Kenny Anderson (born 1967), Scottish musician known by the stage name King Creosote

Sports
 Kenneth Anderson (footballer) (1875–1900), Scottish footballer (Queen's Park, national team)
 Ken Anderson (basketball) (born 1933), American basketball coach
 Ken Anderson (quarterback) (born 1949), American football quarterback
 Kenny Anderson (basketball) (born 1970), American basketball point guard
 Ken Anderson (defensive lineman) (1975–2009), American football defensive lineman
 Ken Anderson (wrestler) (born 1976), American professional wrestler
 Kenny Anderson (boxer) (born 1983), Scottish boxer
 Kenny Anderson (footballer) (born 1992), Dutch-Scottish footballer
 Ken Anderson (motorsport), engineer and principal of the US F1 Formula One team

Other
 Kenneth Lewis Anderson (1805–1845), lawyer, last vice president of the Republic of Texas
 Kenneth Anderson (British Army officer) (1891–1959), British Army general
 Sir Kenneth Anderson, 1st Baronet (1866–1942), British shipowner
 Ken Anderson (politician) (1909–1985), Australian senator
 Ken Anderson (Texas prosecutor), in Michael Morton case
 Kenneth Anderson (jurist), law professor at Washington College of Law
 Kenny Anderson, a character from the American TV sitcom The Office

See also
 Kennet Andersson (born 1967), Swedish football player
 Kenneth C. Anderson (disambiguation)